Kodeoha (Kondeha) is an Austronesian language of Southeast Sulawesi, Indonesia.

Further reading
Mead, David. 1998. Proto-Bungku-Tolaki: Reconstruction of its phonology and aspects of its morphosyntax. PhD dissertation. Houston: Rice University.
Mead, David. 1999. The Bungku–Tolaki languages of south-eastern Sulawesi, Indonesia. Series D-91. Canberra: Pacific Linguistics.

References

Bungku–Tolaki languages
Languages of Sulawesi